Henosferus is an extinct genus of australosphenidan mammal from Lower Jurassic of Argentina. The only recorded species, Henosferus molus, was found in the Cañadón Asfalto Formation of the Cañadón Asfalto Basin in Chubut Province, Patagonia. The species is known only from 3 lower jaws and possibly an upper molar.

References 

Australosphenida
Bathonian life
Jurassic mammals of South America
Middle Jurassic tetrapods of South America
Jurassic Argentina
Fossils of Argentina
Cañadón Asfalto Formation
Fossil taxa described in 2007
Prehistoric mammal genera